Mount González is a prominent mountain  east of Asman Ridge in the Sarnoff Mountains of the Ford Ranges of Marie Byrd Land, Antarctica. It was mapped by the United States Antarctic Service (1939–41) and by the United States Geological Survey from surveys and U.S. Navy air photos (1959–65). It was named by the Advisory Committee on Antarctic Names after Óscar González, a geologist at the Universidad de Chile, and a member of the United States Antarctic Research Program Marie Byrd Land Survey II, 1967–68.

See also
Mount Stagnaro

References

Mountains of Marie Byrd Land